The Steigerwald Lake National Wildlife Refuge is a  riverine flood plain habitat, semi-permanent wetland on the Columbia River,  east of Vancouver, Washington, with cottonwood-dominated riparian corridors, pastures, and remnant stands of Oregon white oak.

The refuge lies partly within the Columbia River Gorge National Scenic Area and serves as the operational headquarters for the  Pierce National Wildlife Refuge. It has been designated as the site of the "Gateway to the Gorge" visitor center. This facility was completed in late 2022. The Washington Department of Transportation has estimated that this facility may be used by as many as 100,000 visitors annually, providing the it with one of the best outreach opportunities in the Pacific Northwest.

References

External links
Steigerwald Lake National Wildlife Refuge - U.S. Fish and Wildlife Service. Restoration page

National Wildlife Refuges in Washington (state)
Protected areas of Clark County, Washington
Wetlands of Washington (state)
Landforms of Clark County, Washington